Ferenc Hompóth (born 22 February 1968) is a Hungarian rower. He competed in the men's quadruple sculls event at the 1988 Summer Olympics.

References

1968 births
Living people
Hungarian male rowers
Olympic rowers of Hungary
Rowers at the 1988 Summer Olympics
Rowers from Budapest